São João de Lourosa is a civil parish in the municipality of Viseu, Portugal. It has 24.30 km2 and had 4702 inhabitants in the 2011 census.

References

Freguesias of Viseu